German submarine U-706, a type VIIC U-boat, was laid down on 22 November 1940. She was launched on 24 November 1941 and commissioned on 16 March 1942.

Design
German Type VIIC submarines were preceded by the shorter Type VIIB submarines. U-706 had a displacement of  when at the surface and  while submerged. She had two shafts and two  propellers.

U-706 was fitted with five  torpedo tubes (four fitted at the bow and one at the stern), fourteen torpedoes, one  SK C/35 naval gun, 220 rounds, and a  C/30 anti-aircraft gun. The boat had a complement of between forty-four and sixty.

Service history
U-706 was commanded by Korvettenkapitän Alexander von Zitzewitz. She was attached to the 5th Flotilla from 16 March until 30 September 1942. On 2 August 1943, while in Bay of Biscay, she was disabled by depth charges from a Canadian Hampden aircraft, then finished off by a US Liberator aircraft from A/S Sqdn. 4. She sank at position .

Wolfpacks
U-706 took part in ten wolfpacks, namely:
 Luchs (1 – 6 October 1942) 
 Panther (6 – 20 October 1942) 
 Südwärts (24 – 26 October 1942) 
 Falke (28 December 1942 – 4 January 1943) 
 Jaguar (18 – 31 January 1943) 
 Seeteufel (23 – 30 March 1943) 
 Löwenherz (1 – 10 April 1943) 
 Lerche (10 – 16 April 1943) 
 Meise (16 – 22 April 1943) 
 Specht (22 April – 4 May 1943)

Summary of raiding history

References

Bibliography

External links

World War II submarines of Germany
1940 ships
U-boats commissioned in 1942
Ships built in Hamburg
U-boats sunk in 1943
U-boats sunk by Canadian aircraft
U-boats sunk by US aircraft
U-boats sunk by depth charges
World War II shipwrecks in the Atlantic Ocean
German Type VIIC submarines
Maritime incidents in August 1943